Tyrone County Hospital was a hospital and the main health facility in Omagh, County Tyrone, Northern Ireland. The hospital occupied the same site in the town from 1899 until it closed to new patients on 20 June 2017 when it was replaced by the newly built Omagh Hospital and Primary Care Complex.

History
The hospital has its origins in an infirmary which was opened in Market Street in Omagh in 1796. The hospital moved to a new site on Hospital Road in 1899. A post graduate centre for students of Queen's University Belfast was opened by Richard Needham in July 1988 and a new renal unit followed in August 1989.

In June 2002 the then Health Minister Bairbre de Brún announced the closure of the hospital, a decision which was confirmed by the new Health Minister Michael McGimpsey in January 2009. After services transferred to the new Omagh Hospital and Primary Care Complex the Tyrone County Hospital closed at 08:00 AM on 20 June 2017.

References

External links 

Hospitals in County Tyrone
Defunct hospitals in Northern Ireland
Omagh
Hospitals established in 1899
1899 establishments in Ireland
Hospitals disestablished in 2017
2017 disestablishments in Ireland